John Francis O'Driscoll (20 September 1921 in Cork, Ireland – 11 March 1988 in Swansea, Wales), commonly referred to as Jackie O'Driscoll, is a former  Irish footballer who played as a winger for several teams in the League of Ireland. He also played for Swansea Town. O'Driscoll was a dual international and played for both Ireland teams - the FAI XI and the IFA XI.

Irish international
When O'Driscoll began his international career in 1948 there were, in effect, two Ireland teams, chosen by two rival associations. Both associations, the Northern Ireland-based IFA and the Ireland-based FAI claimed jurisdiction over the whole of Ireland and selected players from the whole island. As a result, several notable Irish players from this era, including O'Driscoll, played for both teams.

IFA XI
Between 1948 and 1949 O'Driscoll made 3 appearances for the IFA XI . On 9 October 1948 he made his international debut for the IFA XI in a 6–2 defeat against England. On 17 November 1948 he made his second appearance for the IFA XI in a 3–2 defeat against Scotland. He made his last appearance for the IFA XI against Wales on 9 March 1949 in a 2–0 defeat.

FAI XI
Between 1948 and 1949 O'Driscoll also made 3 appearances for the FAI XI. He  won his first cap on 5 December 1948 in a 1–0 defeat in a friendly Switzerland at Dalymount Park. He also played for the FAI XI on 24 April 1949 in another friendly at Dalymount against Belgium. This time the FAI XI lost 2–0. He won his final FAI XI cap on 2 June 1949 a in 3–1 away defeat against Sweden, a qualifier for the 1950 FIFA World Cup.

Honours

Player

Waterford

League of Ireland
Runners Up 1940–41: 1
FAI Cup
Runners Up 1941: 1

Cork United

League of Ireland
Winners 1942–43, 1944–45, 1945–46 3
FAI Cup
Winners 1947 1
Runners Up 1943 1
League of Ireland Shield
Winners 1943 1
Munster Senior Cup
Winners 1945, 1946, 1947 3

Swansea Town

Third Division South
Winners 1948-49: 1

Llanelli

West Wales Senior Cup
Winners 1952-53: 1

References

External links
Northern Ireland's Footballing Greats
Ireland (FAI) stats

1921 births
1988 deaths
Republic of Ireland association footballers
Pre-1950 IFA international footballers
Ireland (FAI) international footballers
Dual Irish international footballers
League of Ireland players
Swansea City A.F.C. players
Shelbourne F.C. players
Waterford F.C. players
Cork F.C. players
Cork United F.C. (1940–1948) players
Llanelli Town A.F.C. players
English Football League players
Cork City F.C. (1938–1940) players
Association football forwards